Sir Walter Angus Bethune (10 September 1908 – 22 August 2004) was an Australian politician and member of the Tasmanian House of Assembly. He was Premier of Tasmania from 26 May 1969 to 3 May 1972.

Early life
Bethune was born in Sheffield in north-western Tasmania, and was educated at Launceston Grammar School and The Hutchins School in Hobart. Before entering politics, Bethune worked as a jackaroo. On 15 August 1940, during World War II, he enlisted as an airman and Warrant Officer in the Royal Australian Air Force. He married Alix (Alexandra) Perronet Pritchard of Cluny, Ouse on 30 January 1936.

Political career
Bethune was elected to the Tasmanian House of Assembly at the 1946 general election on 23 November 1946, representing the seat of Wilmot (now Lyons) for the newly formed Liberal Party. On 19 March 1960, Bethune became Leader of the Opposition when the leader of the Liberal Party, Tim Jackson resigned in protest at party disunity and a lack of support for his leadership.

On 7 September 1966, Kevin Lyons (the son of former Premier and Prime Minister Joseph Lyons) resigned from the state Liberal Party after a dispute over preselection, and on 15 October formed the Centre Party. In 1969, Lyons held the balance of power, and offered his support to Bethune to form government with himself as Deputy Premier. Bethune accepted.  This forced Labor Premier Eric Reece to resign on 26 May, making Bethune the first non-Labor Premier of Tasmania in 35 years, and the first to hold the post since the main non-Labor party in Tasmania adopted the Liberal banner in 1946.  He also served as his own Treasurer.

During his term as Premier, Bethune introduced a number of important initiatives, although he had pledged to avoid "revolutionary changes". Bethune's government introduced random breath tests to tackle drink driving, made the wearing of seatbelts compulsory, set up the Tasmania Parks and Wildlife Service, built more schools and tightened state finances.

Bethune was instrumental in the establishment of a Hansard service for the Tasmanian parliament, although he was no longer Premier by the time the system was introduced. Kevin Lyons had lost a vote to introduce Hansard in 1960, and with the Bethune-Lyons coalition in power in 1969, Bethune sought a report into the feasibility of such a transcription service. The report was not completed until 1973, but Hansard was considered by Bethune's successors Eric Reece and Doug Lowe until finally being implemented in 1979.

In 1972, Kevin Lyons dissolved the coalition between the Centre and Liberal parties, and was highly critical of Bethune. Bethune was forced to the polls, and the instability in his government saw him lose power in the election on a three-seat swing. Labor won a clear majority, and Reece returned as premier.

After politics
Bethune retired from politics on 30 June 1975, and later joined forces with his former rival, Eric Reece, to back the Franklin Dam.

Sir Angus died after a short illness on 22 August 2004 in Hobart, aged 95. He was accorded a state funeral which was held on 27 August.

Honours
Bethune was made Knight Bachelor on 16 June 1979 in recognition of service to the Parliament of Tasmania. He was also awarded a Centenary Medal in 2001.

References

External links
 

1908 births
2004 deaths
Liberal Party of Australia members of the Parliament of Tasmania
Premiers of Tasmania
Royal Australian Air Force airmen
Royal Australian Air Force personnel of World War II
Australian Knights Bachelor
Australian politicians awarded knighthoods
Recipients of the Centenary Medal
People educated at Launceston Church Grammar School
Australian people of Scottish descent
Leaders of the Opposition in Tasmania
Treasurers of Tasmania
20th-century Australian politicians